Valerie Domleo (born 11 April 1932) is a retired English rally co-driver.

Career
During the 1960s, she competed in European Rally Championship events, mainly as co-driver to numerous lady drivers of that period, including Rosemary Smith, Pat Moss, Pauline Mayman and Anne Hall. With Anne Hall she won the Ladies Award in the 1960 RAC Rally and the 1961 Monte Carlo Rally.

An article in Motor Sport in July 1961 described her as "one of Britain's best navigators".

Personal life
Valerie was born in Hendon, Middlesex to Allan Domleo and Ella Muriel White. She has an older brother, Allan P. Domleo.

In 1966, Valerie married gentleman rally driver Donald Morley in Warwick. and were married until his death in 2006. They have two sons, Andrew and Roger, both born in Ipswich.

In her later years after retiring from rallying, Valerie and her family became farmers in Stowmarket.

References

External links
 eWRC

Female rally drivers
British rally co-drivers
1932 births
Living people
English female racing drivers